The Besana Group is an important company that has various production and commercial plants in Italy and abroad (over 2,000) in terms of production, processing and commercialisation of nuts and dried fruit.

Thanks to their strong relationship with the major multiples and primary food industries, the Group achieves a turnover of about €115 million; 75% of the production is exported.

The Besana Group produces more than 16,000 tons of nuts and dried fruit every year with a total of 400 highly skilled employees and workers in Italy and further 300 abroad.

History
In 1921, Emilio Besana and his brother Vincenzo. founded "Emilio Besana & Co." - which after 80 years has become the "Besana Group". Dedication to the product allowed the company in a short period to become a major force within the market place.

In the 1930s the Besana brothers entered: America and Far East allowing the company to expand globally. A new plant was built in San Gennaro Vesuviano, which is still currently the site of the Besana Group.

Throughout its history the Besana Group has invested in the most up to date equipment, reflecting its pre-eminent position. As a consequence the Besana Group has always been a major employer within the Campania region.

From the 1950s to the 1960s, Besana Group expanded its product range. In the 1950s with almonds from the Italian regions of Apulia and Sicily, then in the early 1960s with Brazil nuts, Pecan nuts, dried fruit, seeds, pistachios, pine kernels, Macadamia nuts, and finally the snack lines.

From the 1970s the company's market share continued to strengthen both nationally and internationally.

 1989: Besana UK. Limited opens - to introduce processed products to UK (multiples) and Northern Europe (multiples and processing sector)
 1988: partnership with Uno Moc, an organisation for both fresh and processed products
 2000: partnership with "Almaverde Bio", a consortium for the promotion, production and sale of organic produce.
 2002: partnership with Mediterranean Fruit Company (M.F.C), a consortium promoting the Italian fruit and vegetable sector outside the Italian market.
 2003: partnership with "Made in Blu Trading", a consortium promoting Italian high quality produce outside the Italian market.

Food and drink companies of Italy
San Gennaro Vesuviano